Callidula fasciata is a moth in the  family Callidulidae. It is found on Ternate.

References

Callidulidae
Moths described in 1877